A hedge maze is an outdoor garden maze or labyrinth in which the "walls" or dividers between passages are made of vertical hedges.

History

Hedge mazes evolved from the knot gardens of Renaissance Europe, and were first constructed during the mid-16th century. These early mazes were very low, initially planted with evergreen herbs, but, over time, dwarf box became a more popular option due to its robustness. Italian architects had been sketching conceptual garden labyrinths as early as 1460, and hundreds of mazes were constructed in Europe between the 16th and 18th centuries.

Initially, the hedge maze was not intended to confuse, but to provide a unicursal walking path. Puzzle-like hedge mazes featuring dead ends and tall hedges arrived in England during the reign of King William III of England. They were now part of the bosquet or wilderness part of the garden, and extended area of highly artificial formal woodland, with groups of trees enclosed by hedges.  It was possible to get lost in the much-admired labyrinth of Versailles, built for Louis XIV of France in 1677 and destroyed in 1778. This maze was adorned with thirty-nine hydraulic sculpture groups depicting Aesop's fables. The oldest surviving puzzle hedge maze, at Hampton Court Palace in Surrey, England, was built for King William in the late 17th century.  Its distinctive trapezoidal shape is due to pre-existing paths running alongside the maze.

In modern times, hedge mazes have increased in complexity. A hedge maze at Longleat House in Wiltshire, England, designed in 1978, features a three-dimensional maze that uses bridges and a grid-less layout to confuse visitors.

Notable public hedge mazes

 Blackpool Pleasure Beach, England, has a maze, though only part is constructed from hedges.
 Blackgang Chine, Isle of Wight, England. 
 Blenheim Palace, England
 Castlewellan, Northern Ireland, world's largest permanent hedge maze
 Chatsworth House, England
 Disneyland Paris has a hedgemaze in Alice's Curious Labyrinth, an Alice in Wonderland themed area.
 Obludiste, Czech Republic
 Egeskov Castle, Denmark
 The Garden Maze at Luray Caverns, Luray, Virginia, US
 The Governor's Palace Maze in Colonial Williamsburg, Williamsburg, Virginia, US 
 Hampton Court Maze, England
 Kaeser Memorial Maze, Missouri Botanical Garden, St. Louis, Missouri, US
 Laberint d'Horta, Barcelona, Catalonia, Spain
 Leeds Castle, England
 Longleat, England
 Bridge End Gardens, Saffron Walden, Essex, England
 Schönbrunn Palace, Austria
Traquair House, Peeblesshire, Scotland
 Villa Vizcaya, Miami, Florida, US
 Botanical World Adventures hedgemaze, Hakalau, Hawaii, US

See also

 Corn maze
 Straw maze
 Turf maze

References

Further reading

External links
 

Mazes
Garden features